Fuxianhuia is a genus of Lower Cambrian fossil arthropod known from the Chengjiang fauna in China.  Its purportedly primitive features have led to its playing a pivotal role in discussions about the euarthropod stem group. Nevertheless, despite being known from many specimens, disputes about its morphology, in particular its head appendages, have made it one of the most controversial of the Chengjiang taxa, and it has been discussed extensively in the context of the arthropod head problem.

The genus is named after Fuxian Lake (Fuxian Hu), where it was unearthed. Its specific name protensa refers to its extended trunk.

Description 

Complete Fuxianhuia specimens are approximately 4 centimetres long.  The anterior of Fuxianhuia  is encased in an oval sclerite, from which two stalked eyes emerge.  Inserting directly behind this sclerite, on the head shield proper, are two stout antennae.  When the head of Fuxianhuia was originally described, two additional head appendages, the "sub-chelate" pair were also described.  These are geniculate, backward-pointing appendages that lie in a highly stereotypical position (i.e., their position does not vary much from one specimen to another). Partly because of this, and partly because of their rather indistinct morphology, their status as appendages has been questioned.  Indeed, on the grounds that these structures seem to lie between two cuticular layers, Waloszek and colleagues have suggested that they are not appendages at all, but rather gut diverticula; a reassignment that has however not been universally accepted. Ventrally, a large plate has been interpreted as a hypostome.

The head shield overlaps a tapering series of 12–17 trunk tergites, which lead into a set of limb-bearing segments comprising the thorax.  The limbs are simple in form, consisting of a smooth oval exopod and a stout, annulated endopod.  There is no one-to-one correspondence between the thoracic tergites and the limbs, but, rather, there appear to be two or three limbs per tergite.

Behind the thorax is a narrower abdominal region, consisting of 14 tergites, that bears no appendages.  The abdomen is terminated by a telson-like spine.

Brain anatomy

In 2012, a Fuxianhuia fossil was described with exceptional preservation of brain and optic lobes. The shape and complexity corresponds roughly to that of a modern malacostracan brain. In general, the Fuxianhuia brain shows the same tripartite morphology of Malacostraca, Chilopoda and Insecta, indicating that such an organization could be precedent to the divergence between these clades.

Cardiovascular anatomy
In 2014 a fossil was described that preserved in exquisite, unequaled detail the tubular heart and blood vessels, which represent the oldest cardiovascular system yet identified.  "The rich vascularization in the head... suggests that the brain of this species required a good supply of oxygen for its performance," said University of Arizona neuroscientist Nicholas Strausfeld, one of the researchers.

Classification 

Fuxianhuia was first described from incomplete material, and its true nature did not become apparent until the head and limbs were discovered.  Its articulated head region, lack of tergite-segment correspondence and undifferentiated limbs have all been taken to indicate a very basal position in the arthropods, even though an early cladistic analysis suggested, rather, that it was a stem-group chelicerate.  The presence of a distinct anterior sclerite bearing the eyes has been taken to suggest that a distinct acron once existed in front of the euarthropod head.

Fuxianhuia is not a unique arthropod, it is now recognised to belong to the clade Fuxianhuiida including other similar forms from the Cambrian of China, within Fuxianhuiida it is most closely related to Guangweicaris, together forming the family Fuxianhuiidae. A cladogram is given below.

From.

References

Further reading 
 Hou, Xian-Guang; Aldridge, Richard J., Bengstrom, Jan; Siveter, David J.; Feng, Xiang-Hong 2004; The Cambrian Fossils of Chengjang, China, Blackwell Science Ltd, 233 pp.

Prehistoric arthropod genera
Cambrian arthropods
Prehistoric animals of China
Cambrian genus extinctions